Roundstone may refer to:

Australia
Roundstone, Queensland, a locality in the Shire of Banana, Australia

Ireland
Roundstone, County Galway, a village in the Republic of Ireland

United Kingdom 

Roundstone, West Sussex, a village in England
Roundstone Music, an English rock band

United States
Roundstone, Kentucky, an unincorporated community
Roundstone Creek, a stream in Kentucky